The 2008 Vodacom Cup was played between 22 February and 16 May 2008 and was the 11th edition of this annual domestic cup competition. This edition of the Vodacom Cup was played between the fourteen provincial rugby union teams in South Africa from the Currie Cup Premier and First Divisions.

Competition

There were fourteen teams participating in the 2008 Vodacom Cup competition. These teams were geographically divided into two sections - the Northern Section and the Southern Section – with seven teams in each section. Teams played all the teams in the other section once over the course of the season, either at home or away.

Teams received four points for a win and two points for a draw. Bonus points were awarded to teams that scored four or more tries in a game, as well as to teams that lost a match by seven points or less. Teams were ranked by points, then points difference (points scored less points conceded).

The top four teams in each section qualified for the play-offs. In the quarter finals, the teams that finished first in each section had home advantage against the teams that finished fourth in the other section and the teams that finished second in each section had home advantage against the teams that finished third in the other section. The winners of these quarter finals then played each other in the semi-finals, with the higher placed team having home advantage. The two semi-final winners then met in the final.

Teams

Changes from 2007

 There were no changes from the 2007 Vodacom Cup.

Team listing

The following teams took part in the 2008 Vodacom Cup competition:

Tables

Northern Section

Southern Section

Results

Round one

Round two

Round three

Round four

Round five

Round six

Round seven

Quarter-finals

Semi-finals

Final

Winners

Players

Player statistics

The following table contain points which were scored during the 2008 Vodacom Cup season.

See also
 Vodacom Cup
 2008 Currie Cup Premier Division
 2008 Currie Cup First Division

External links

References

Vodacom Cup
2008 in South African rugby union
2008 rugby union tournaments for clubs